Tre'Davious White Sr. (born January 16, 1995) is an American football cornerback for the Buffalo Bills of the National Football League (NFL). He played college football at LSU, where he was a consensus All-American as a senior in 2016. He was drafted by the Bills in the first round of the 2017 NFL Draft. Since earning a starting position as a rookie, White has become one of the league's top cornerbacks as part of a resurgent Bills defense, having garnered two Pro Bowl selections and All-Pro honors.

Early years

White attended Green Oaks High School in Shreveport, Louisiana. He played both cornerback and quarterback. He was rated by Rivals.com as a five-star recruit and was ranked as the fourth best cornerback and 18th best overall player in his class. White committed to Louisiana State University (LSU) to play college football under head coach Les Miles.

College career
White stated that he originally committed to LSU as a wide receiver, but that he chose to remain a defensive back when he realized he was unlikely to see significant playing time on a roster that included future NFL stars Odell Beckham Jr. and Jarvis Landry. As a true freshman at LSU, White played in 13 games with 11 starts. He finished the season with 55 tackles and two interceptions. As a sophomore in 2014 he started all 13 games and also served as the punt returner. He recorded 33 tackles, two interceptions and a punt return touchdown. As a junior, he was chosen to wear the No. 18 Jersey, which signifies the player with the best leadership qualities on the team. He finished the year with 44 tackles and returned a punt 69 yards for a touchdown against Syracuse. The Associated Press and Southeastern Conference (SEC) coaches both selected White for their All-SEC second team. White was expected to be a late first-round choice in the 2016 NFL Draft, but he instead chose to return to LSU for his senior season. After the season, he earned first-team All-SEC honors from the AP. He was also a consensus All-American, earning first-team honors from the American Football Coaches Association and Walter Camp Football Foundation.

Professional career
White was invited to the Senior Bowl and was set to play until he injured his ankle during practice. He was able to raise his draft stock after practicing well and showing an ability to learn quickly while working with Cleveland Browns
defensive backs coach DeWayne Walker for the Senior Bowl. He attended the NFL Combine and was able to complete all the combine and positional drills.

White also participated at LSU's Pro Day and opted to attempt to beat his combine times in the 40, 20, and 10-yard dash, but was unable to. NFL draft experts and analysts projected him to be selected in the first or second round. He was ranked the third best cornerback in the draft by Sports Illustrated, Pro Football Focus, and ESPN, ranked the fourth best cornerback by NFL analyst Bucky Brooks, ranked the fifth best cornerback by NFL analyst Mike Mayock, and ranked the seventh best cornerback by DraftScout.com.

2017
The Buffalo Bills selected White in the first round (27th overall) of the 2017 NFL Draft. He was the fifth cornerback drafted in 2017.

 
On May 18, 2017, the Buffalo Bills signed White to a four-year, $10.09 million contract that includes $7.78 million guaranteed and a signing bonus of $5.47 million.

Head coach Sean McDermott named White the No. 1 starting cornerback on the Bills' depth chart to start the regular season, alongside E. J. Gaines.

White made his professional regular season debut and first career start in the Buffalo Bills' season-opener against the New York Jets, recording four solo tackles and two pass deflections in Bills' 21–12 victory. On September 24, 2017, White recorded a season-high seven combined tackles, a season-high four pass deflections, and made his first career interception during a 26–16 victory against the Denver Broncos in Week 3. White intercepted a pass by quarterback Trevor Siemian to seal the Bills' victory in the fourth quarter. He was named the NFL Defensive Rookie of the Month for September.

In Week 4,  he made four combined tackles, a pass deflection, and returned a fumble recovery for his first career touchdown during a 23–17 upset win over the Atlanta Falcons. On October 22, 2017, White tackled wide receiver Adam Humphries, forcing him to fumble the ball, and recovered it to set up the Bills' game-winning field goal during their 30–27 victory against the Tampa Bay Buccaneers. On November 26, 2017, White intercepted a pass from quarterback Alex Smith and returned it 63 yards with 1:28 left in the fourth quarter of the Bills’ 16–10 victory at the Kansas City Chiefs. In Week 13, White made five combined tackles, a pass deflection, and an interception during a 23–3 loss to the New England Patriots. The interception was a pass by quarterback Tom Brady intended for tight end Rob Gronkowski. Immediately after the play, Gronkowski jumped elbow-first onto White while he was still on the ground and drew a personal foul penalty. White suffered a concussion as a result of the hit. Gronkowski was upset, claiming that White should have been flagged for a pass interference penalty, but nonetheless was suspended one game for the hit.

White started all 16 games as a rookie in 2017 and recorded 69 combined tackles (53 solo), 18 pass deflections, and four interceptions. Pro Football Focus gave White an overall grade of 91.6, which ranked third among all qualifying cornerbacks in 2017. White was a finalist for 2017 Defensive Rookie of the Year award, but lost to Marshon Lattimore of the New Orleans Saints. His performance helped Buffalo clinch a wild-card berth, their first playoff appearance since 1999. On January 7, 2018, White started in his first career playoff game and recorded a tackle and a pass deflection during the Bills' 10–3 loss at the Jacksonville Jaguars in the AFC Wildcard Game.

2018
In week 9 against the Chicago Bears, White intercepted quarterback Mitchell Trubisky and returned it for 37 yards in the 41–9 loss. White finished the 2018 season with 54 combined tackles, 8 passes defensed, and two interceptions as the Bills finished with the number one ranked pass defense.

2019

In week 3 against the Cincinnati Bengals, White intercepted Andy Dalton twice as the Bills won 21–17. Against the Miami Dolphins in week 7, White caused two crucial turnovers to help Buffalo win 31–21, intercepting Ryan Fitzpatrick at the Buffalo 2-yard line and forcing receiver Preston Williams to fumble at Miami's 30-yard line. The Bills scored off of both turnovers.
He was named the AFC Defensive Player of the Week for his performance.
In week 9 against the Washington Redskins, White recorded his first career sack on rookie quarterback Dwayne Haskins in the 24–9 win.
In week 12 against the Denver Broncos, White recorded a team high 4 passes defended and intercepted a pass thrown by Brandon Allen in the 20–3 win. White recorded his second game of 2019 with two interceptions in week 15 against the Pittsburgh Steelers on Sunday Night Football, picking off quarterback Devlin Hodges twice. On December 17, 2019 it was announced that White earned the first Pro Bowl invite of his career. Despite sitting out the final week of the season against the New York Jets to rest for the playoffs, White still managed to co-lead the league in interceptions in 2019 with six and also did not allow a single touchdown reception by opponents throughout the season.

During the wild-card game against the Houston Texans, White was featured in a marquee match up against Texans receiver DeAndre Hopkins. White finished with five combined tackles, including a forced fumble on Hopkins which was recovered by teammate Tremaine Edmunds, as the Bills lost 22–19 in overtime.

2020
On April 23, 2020, the Bills exercised the fifth-year option on White's contract. On September 5, 2020, White signed a four-year contract extension worth $70 million with $55 million guaranteed with the Bills, keeping him under contract through the 2025 season. The contract made him the highest-paid defensive back in the league at the time.

In Week 5 against the Tennessee Titans, White was ruled out with a back injury, missing just the second game of his professional career. White recorded his first takeaways of the season in Week 9 against the Seattle Seahawks, recovering a Russell Wilson fumble forced by teammate Jerry Hughes in the third quarter and picking off Wilson in the fourth quarter, as Buffalo would win 44–34.
In Week 15 against the Denver Broncos, White forced a fumble on quarterback Drew Lock that was recovered by Hughes, who returned it for a 21 yard touchdown during the 48–19 win. Overall, White finished the 2020 season with 57 total tackles, 1.5 sacks, and 3 interceptions. He was named a second-team All-Pro and was invited to the 2021 Pro Bowl following the season's conclusion.

2021
White recorded his first interception of the season against the New York Jets in Week 10. During a Thanksgiving game against the New Orleans Saints, White suffered a non-contact injury to his left knee in the second quarter and was ruled out of the game after halftime. The following day on November 26, it was revealed that he tore his ACL and was ruled out for the rest of the season. Buffalo officially put him on injured reserve on November 30.

2022
White noted that the injury was the first time since middle school that he, a three-sport athlete in high school, had been sedentary, and briefly fell into depression; he eventually was coaxed out by his former LSU teammates, Bills teammates and reporter Michele Tafoya, a personal friend; he purposely chose to slow-walk his injury recovery in deference to the training staff's decisions. On August 30, 2022, White was place on the physically unable to perform list, missing the first seven games of the regular season. He was activated on November 1, in time for the matchup against the New York Jets.

White made his return to play on the Thanksgiving game—52 weeks to the day of his injury—on November 24, 2022 against the Detroit Lions, playing the first two drives (in which Lions quarterback Jared Goff avoided throwing toward him) before leaving the game as part of the coaching staff's limited phase-in plan for White's return.

NFL career statistics

Regular season

Postseason

Personal life
White is married with two children. His eldest, son Tre'Davious Jr., was born shortly after he was drafted.

In 2018, as part of a cross-promotion between Pegula Sports and Entertainment sports properties, White appeared in a commercial for the fictional "Tre White Goalie Academy" promoting White's effort to be elected to a Pro Bowl. The commercial became a sort of running gag for White, who notes the similarities between the goaltender and defensive back positions in that both serve as a last line of defense against scoring, and that there were no collegiate hockey teams in Louisiana (White had been a track and basketball star during football offseason in high school). White became a fan of Buffalo Sabres goaltender Carter Hutton (whom White mock-mistakenly called "Sutton" in the video) as a result of making the commercial, having otherwise largely been unaware of hockey before joining the Bills. In White's first Sunday Night Football appearance in 2019, White identified his alma mater as the Tre White Goalie Academy during on-screen introductions; White subsequently caught two interceptions in the game, playing a major role in the Bills' playoff-clinching win.

References

External links
 
 LSU Tigers bio
 College stats from Sports Reference

1995 births
Living people
Players of American football from Shreveport, Louisiana
American football cornerbacks
LSU Tigers football players
All-American college football players
Buffalo Bills players
American Conference Pro Bowl players
Ed Block Courage Award recipients